Vittorio Moroni (born 1971 in Sondrio) is an Italian director and screenwriter.

He has directed three feature films, Tu devi essere il lupo (You Must Be the Wolf) that was nominated for the David di Donatello for Best New Director and Silver Ribbon in 2006 shot in Sondrio and Lisbon, Le ferie di Licu (Licu’s Holidays) shot in Rome and Bangladesh, for which he was nominated for the 2007 Silver Ribbon for best documentary, and the 2009's Eva e Adamo (Eve and Adam).

As a screenwriter, he has twice won the Premio Solinas, with Il sentiero del gatto (The Path of the Cat) (1998) and Una rivoluzione (One Revolution) (2002).  In 2009 he received a scholarship for the treatment Se chiudo gli occhi non sono più qui (If i close my eyes I am not here anymore) and he was two times finalist with L’intruso (The Intruder) (2002) and Senza guardare giù (Without Looking Down) (2010).  In 2010, he wrote with Emanuele Crialese the screenplay Terraferma by Emanuele Crialese (Special Jury Award Venezia 2011 and Italian film candidated to Oscar Awards 2012) and he wrote with Alessandro Gassmann the screenplay for Alessandro Gassman’s film Roman e il suo cucciolo.  In 2009 he won the award for drama SIAE-AGIS-ETI with the theater piece La terza vita (The Third Life), staged in Italian theaters from 2011.  Among the short films made, Eccesso di zelo (Too Much Zeal'') (1997) won awards at many festivals - including the Nanni Moretti’s Sacher Silver Award and Universal Studios Award, which allowed Moroni to make a masterclass at the studios of Universal Pictures in Hollywood.

Filmography

Screenwriter

Theater

References

External links

 
 EVE AND ADAMO at 50notturno.it

1971 births
Italian film directors
Italian screenwriters
Italian male screenwriters
Living people